Mert Kılıç  (born 20 April 1978) is a Turkish actor and model.

Before starting his career as a model, Kılıç played football professionally in Vanspor, Edirnespor and Tekirdağspor. In 2002, he was chosen as the Best Model in a local competition. He later moved to the United States to study acting at the Beverly Hills Playhouse. After making his debut in 2003 with a supporting role in Gurbet Kadını, he continued his career with recurring roles. His breakthrough came with Şefkat Tepe, in which he had a leading role.

Between 2001–2002, he was in a relationship with Azerbaijani singer Aygün Kazımova. In June 2013, he married Aslıhan Güner, his co-star from Şefkat Tepe.

Filmography

References

External links 

1978 births
People from Merzifon
Turkish male models
Turkish male television actors
Turkish male film actors
Living people